Supersonic Girl is the debut album of J-Pop singer, Nana Mizuki. It was released on 5 December 2001.

Track listing
Love's Wonderland
Lyrics: Chokkyu Murano
Composition: Ataru Sumiyoshi
Arrangement: Nobuhiro Makino
The Place of Happiness
Lyrics: Chokkyu Murano
Composition: Ataru Sumiyoshi
Arrangement: Nobuhiro Makino
Opening theme for the PS2 game Generation of Chaos.
Supersonic Girl
Lyrics: Chokkyu Murano
Composition: Ataru Sumiyoshi
Arrangement: Nobuhiro Makino
Heaven Knows -Brave edit-
Lyrics: Chokkyu Murano
Composition: Ataru Sumiyoshi
Arrangement: Nobuhiro Makino
Ending theme for anime television series RUN=DIM

Lyrics: Chokkyu Murano
Composition: Ataru Sumiyoshi
Arrangement: Nobuhiro Makino
Look Away-All Together Version-
Lyrics: Chokkyu Murano
Composition: JUNKO
Arrangement: Nobuhiro Makino
TRANSMIGRATION
Lyrics: Masami Okui
Composition and arrangement: Toshiro Yabuki
Masami Okui did a self-cover of this song in her single compilation S-mode#3
LOOKING ON THE MOON
Lyrics: Chokkyu Murano
Composition and arrangement: Nobuhiro Makino

Composition and arrangement: Nobuhiro Makino

Lyrics: Misaki Asou
Composition: Eisaku Nambu
Arrangement: Nobuhiro Makino
Ending theme for TV show 

Lyrics: Chokkyu Murano
Composition: Ataru Sumiyoshi
Arrangement: Nobuhiro Makino
WINDOW OF HEART
Lyrics: Chokkyu Murano
Composition and arrangement: Nobuhiro Makino

Charts

References
Official website: NANA PARTY

2001 debut albums
Nana Mizuki albums